Greatest Highs is a greatest hits album by American rap rock group Kottonmouth Kings.

Track listing

Disc one

Disc two

Bonus disc*

Bonus disc included with Best Buy purchase of Greatest Highs.

Chart positions

References

2008 greatest hits albums
Kottonmouth Kings albums
Capitol Records compilation albums
Suburban Noize Records compilation albums